Redlight King is a Canadian-American rock band formed in Hamilton, Ontario in 2009. Redlight King have recorded two full-length albums and performed over 1,000 live shows including the largest festivals in North America and Europe. Their credits include over 100 live radio performances and musical guest appearances on both Late Night with Conan O’brien and The Tonight Show with Jay Leno.

Their music has also been featured in such films as The Italian Job, Draft Day, Iron Man 3 and The Avengers, television shows such as Person of Interest, as well as having songs licensed to ESPN, NASCAR, NFL, CFL, NHL, NBA, and MLB.

History

Career 
Mark Kasprzyk formed Redlight King in 2009 with longtime collaborator Julian Tomarin, and signed to Hollywood Records. Kasprzyk made news in 2011 for his success in securing permission from Neil Young to allow him to sample Young's 1972 song, "Old Man". The sample is included in the song "Old Man" (originally titled "Hardworking Hands") on his debut album Something for the Pain, released on June 28, 2011. Old Man peaked at number 17 on the Billboard Alternative Songs and Number 26 on the Billboard Hot Mainstream Rock Tracks.

Redlight King's most successful song and second single off Something for the Pain, "Bullet in My Hand", peaked at numbers 3 and 28 on Billboards Hot Mainstream Rock Tracks and Alternative Songs charts, respectively. Redlight King was also a part of the Rockstar Energy Drink Uproar Festival 2012.

Redlight King released its second studio album Irons In The Fire on September 10, 2013. On July 9, 2013, they released a single from the album entitled "Born to Rise". The track appears in the end title credits for the 2014 film "Draft Day," starring Kevin Costner.

"Born To Rise" has also been used as the pregame music for the NHL's Anaheim Ducks and their AHL affiliate, the San Diego Gulls, and was the title track for the Feature Film "Draft Day" starring Kevin Costner.

In Our Blood (2022-present)
On May 5, 2022, they released the first single "In Our Blood."  It is the title track to their forthcoming album In Our Blood.  On May 9, it was announced they signed to German label AFM Records who will release the album.

Discography

Studio albums

Extended plays

Singles

Music Videos

Features 
 "Hear Our Battle Cry" - Sonic Hijackers, Redlight King
 "Dig Deep" - Sonic Hijackers, Redlight King
 "Run This Town Tonight" - Sonic Hijackers, Redlight King
 "Hard Life" - Redlight King, Robbery Inc.
 "Save You" - Manafest, Redlight King

References

External links 
 Official Website (currently down, March 2022)

Canadian alternative rock groups
Musical groups established in 2009
Musical groups from Hamilton, Ontario
2009 establishments in Ontario